Hank Griffin may refer to
Hank Griffin (boxer), a boxer of the 1890s and early 1900s
Hank Griffin (baseball), a baseball pitcher of the 1910s